The Keiga Jirru are a Nuba peoples ethnic group in the Nuba Mountains of South Kordofan state, in southern Sudan.

They speak Tese, in the Nilo-Saharan language family. The population of this ethnicity is likely below 10,000.

References
Joshua Project

See also
Index: Nuba peoples

Nuba peoples
Ethnic groups in Sudan